Asma Lamnawar (born 25 July 1978) is a Moroccan singer. She made her singing debut in 1995 with "Angham", a festival produced by Moroccan Radio and TV, where she won the prize for best interpretation, though she delayed beginning her musical career until 2002. She has recorded music for Moroccan television serials and films. She toured with the ensemble "Oriental Mood" in Denmark, Sweden and especially in Egypt.

Her first album, "ناري" ("Fiery"), was released in 2002. "شي عادي" ("Something Normal") was released by Art-Jazeera Saudi Arabia in 2005, and she sang a duet with Abu the same year. She signed to Rotana in 2008, and released an album "من هنا لبكره" ("Men Hina L Bukra") with them the same year. Another album (Rouh) was released with Rotana in 2010. Asma released the album Sabiya, produced by Rotana, in 2017.

Asma was one of the singers that took part in the 2022 FIFA Club World Cup official song entitled “Welcome to Morocco”, that took place in Morocco.

Discography

Singles 
Lytima (2017)

Ha 7na Jina (2017)

Hayna (2020)

Omri Wi Shouqi (2021)

Ya Aghla Men Nafsi (2021)

We9tach (2021)

Ana Low (2022)

References

External links
 
 

Living people
21st-century Moroccan women singers
Singers who perform in Classical Arabic
People from Casablanca
1978 births
Moroccan film actresses
Moroccan television actresses